Spring Hill is an inner northern suburb in the City of Brisbane, Queensland, Australia.

Geography 
Parts of Spring Hill can be considered to be extensions of the Brisbane CBD.

The Northern Busway serves the suburb via the Normanby bus stop.  The suburb is home to an established gay bar called The Sportsman Hotel that has been operating for more than 30 years.

History
Spring Hill was originally called Spring Hollow because natural springs in the area supplemented Brisbane's early water supply from the Tank Stream and its dam. The name Spring Hill came into use when prominent citizens began living on the ridge. Boundary Street in Spring Hill and also in West End were named due to the policy of preventing the Jagera and Turrbal peoples from being within the boundaries of the British settlement at night.

All Saints' Anglican Church was opened in 1862. In 1869 it was rebuilt and dedicated. It was consecrated in 1885.

Spring Hill is one of the oldest residential neighbourhoods in Brisbane, with many houses dating from the nineteenth century. As an example, some of the house lots in Sedgebrook Street were surveyed in the 1870s.  However, in recent decades much of the older residential and commercial structures have been demolished to be replaced by modern office blocks and apartment buildings.

A Primitive Methodist Church opened at 48 Leichhardt Street on Sunday 12 July 1874, when it was described as "situated on the highest and most pleasant point of Spring Hill ... a handsome and substantially-built brick edifice, about 51 feet long and 34 feet wide ... capable of comfortably accommodating 200 persons". It was designed by architect Richard Gailey. Having been used as a place of worship for over 100 years, the Methodist Church offered the church building for sale in February 1977, although it was not sold until 30 March 1978, after which it has had a number of commercial occupants. The church building was listed on the Brisbane Heritage Register on 1 January 2004. It is the earliest surviving church in Spring Hill. 

On Sunday 3 December 1876, a Baptist Church was opened in Fortescue Street. In February 1889, services ceased at the church building in preparation for its relocation to Nundah., where it reopened as the Nundah Baptist Church on Sunday 9 June 1889. In 1890, the Baptist City Taberacle opened at 163 Wickham Terrace in Spring Hill.

A government laboratory and animal facility was built in the 1890s adjacent to the Brisbane Grammar School on College Road. It was known as the Bacteriological Institute from 1900 to 1910.

Between 1903 and 1947 trams ran up Edward Street and along Leichhardt Street to Gregory Terrace.  This tram line, operated by the Brisbane City Council, was the steepest in Australia, with a maximum gradient of 1 in 8.  After its closure the trams were initially replaced with diesel buses, but in 1951 these were replaced by a trolley-bus service.  This was in turn replaced by diesel buses in 1968.  The Brisbane City Council continues to provide bus services to the suburb.

The median age of the Spring Hill population was 30 years, 7 years below the Australian median. Children aged under 15 years made up 6.8% of the population and people aged 65 years and over made up 5.6% of the population. The most notable difference was the group in their twenties; in Spring Hill this group made up 36.1% of the population, compared to just 13.8% nationally. 43.8% of people living in Spring Hill were born in Australia, compared to the national average of 69.8%; the next most common countries of birth were Korea, Republic of 3.9%, India 3.8%, New Zealand 3.6%, England 3.5%, Colombia 2.1%. 56.7% of people spoke only English at home; the next most popular languages were 3.3% Korean, 3.3% Mandarin, 3.3% Spanish, 1.7% Portuguese, 1.7% Cantonese. The most common religious affiliation was "No Religion" (28.5%); the next most common responses were Catholic 22.9%, Anglican 8.4%, Hinduism 3.7% and Buddhism 3.1%.

Heritage listings 

Spring Hill has a number of heritage-listed sites, including:

 47-55 Birley Street: McWhinneys Brick Cottage
 283 Boundary Street: Lonsdale House
 477 Boundary Street: Main Roads Building
 19 Gloucester Street: William Grigor's House
 17 Gregory Terrace: Cliveden Mansions
 24 Gregory Terrace: Brisbane Grammar School Buildings
 369 Gregory Terrace: Victoria Flats
 400 Gregory Terrace: Centenary Pool Complex
 449 & 451 Gregory Terrace: Grangehill
 454 Gregory Terrace: Victoria Park
 37 Leichhardt Street: Mountview House
 8 Love Street: Bedford Playground
 Rogers Street: Brisbane Central State School
 43 St Pauls Terrace: St Pauls Presbyterian Church
 43 St Pauls Terrace: St Pauls Presbyterian Church Hall
 71 St Pauls Terrace: Bellmount
 134 St Paul's Terrace: Monier Ventilation Shaft 2
 14 Torrington Street: Spring Hill Baths
 8-12, & 16 Victoria Street: Moody's Cottages
Wickham Terrace: Albert Park (North) air raid shelter
 32 Wickham Terrace: All Saints Anglican Church
 73 Wickham Terrace: Inchcolm
 79 Wickham Terrace: Lister House
 97 Wickham Terrace: Espie Dods House
 121 Wickham Terrace: Ballow Chambers
 136 Wickham Terrace: Wickham Terrace Car Park
 155-157 Wickham Terrace: Wickham House
 163 Wickham Terrace: Baptist City Tabernacle
 183 Wickham Terrace: United Service Club Premises
 217 Wickham Terrace: Craigston
 226 Wickham Terrace: The Old Windmill
 230 Wickham Terrace: Spring Hill Reservoirs
 287 Wickham Terrace: Bryntirion
 307 Wickham Terrace: Athol Place
 330 Wickham Terrace: Wickham Park Air Raid Shelters
 355 Wickham Terrace: Theosophical Society Building
 465 Wickham Terrace: St Andrews War Memorial Hospital Administration Building
 497-535 Wickham Terrace: Lady Bowen Hospital
 500 Wickham Terrace: Monier Ventilation Shaft 1

Attractions 

The Old Windmill in Wickham Park was built in 1824 when Brisbane was a penal colony and originally milled grain and then used as a gallows for the colony. The Spring Hill Baths operated by the Brisbane City Council are the oldest public baths in Queensland.

Education 
Brisbane Central State School is a government primary (Prep-6) school for boys and girls at Rogers Street. In 2018, the school had an enrolment of 347 students with 26 teachers (22 full-time equivalent) and 20 non-teaching staff (11 full-time equivalent).

Brisbane Grammar School is a private primary and secondary (5-12) school for boys at 24 Gregory Terrace. In 2018, the school had an enrolment of 1,708 students with 154 teachers (146 full-time equivalent) and 107 non-teaching staff (95 full-time equivalent).

Brisbane Girls Grammar School is a private secondary (7-12) school at Gregory Terrace. In 2018, the school had an enrolment of 1,367 students with 156 teachers (143.2 full-time equivalent) and 71 non-teaching staff (64.6 full-time equivalent).

St Joseph's College is a Catholic primary and secondary (5-12) school for boys at 285 Gregory Terrace with its Year 10 campus at 40 Quarry Street. In 2018, the school had an enrolment of 1,629 students with 154 teachers (125 full-time equivalent) and 83 non-teaching staff (75 full-time equivalent).

St James College is a Catholic secondary (7-12) school for boys and girls at 201 Boundary Street. In 2018, the school had an enrolment of 411 students with 44 teachers (38 full-time equivalent) and 42 non-teaching staff (33 full-time equivalent).

Arethusa College has a campus at 25 Quarry Street. It is a private secondary (7-12) school with its main campus at Deception Bay.

Amenities 
The Brisbane City Night branch of the Queensland Country Women's Association meets at the International Hotel at 525 Boundary Street.

All Saints Anglican Church is at 32 Wickham Terrace (corner of Ann Street).

The Tongan Valley congregation meets at the Salvation Army Building at 97 School Road. It is part of the Wesleyan Methodist Church.

See also 

 List of Brisbane suburbs

References

External links
 University of Queensland: Queensland Places: Spring Hill

 
Suburbs of the City of Brisbane